Severe Tropical Cyclone Kathy was a powerful tropical cyclone that devastated the Sir Edward Pellew Group of Islands in March 1984. Originating from a tropical low off the southern coast of Papua New Guinea. Tracking westward, the system attained gale-force winds by 18 March before striking the Cape York Peninsula. After crossing the area, Kathy entered the Gulf of Carpentaria where environmental conditions favoured significant development. By this time, the storm had been tracking towards the southwest and struck the Sir Edward Pellew Group of Islands later on 22 March before moving over the Australian mainland as a slightly weaker system. Once over land, Kathy rapidly degraded, losing gale-force winds within 24 hours; the storm dissipated over the Northern Territory on 24 March.

Offshore, 20 vessels were affected, one of which sank and resulted in the death of its captain. In mainland Australia, the system struck a relatively sparsely populated area, with only Borroloola being significantly impacted by the cyclone. Additionally, mangroves at along the McArthur River sustained substantial damage. Overall, losses from the storm were placed at A$12 million (A$30.5 million 2011 AUD; US$24.1 million 2011 USD). Following its usage, the name Kathy was retired and will never be used again to name an Australian cyclone.

Meteorological history

On 16 March 1984, the Bureau of Meteorology began monitoring a tropical low off the southern coast of Papua New Guinea for possible development into a tropical cyclone. Over the following day, the system quickly developed and attained gale-force winds as it neared the Cape York Peninsula. Attaining a pressure of 990 hPa (mbar), the weak system made landfall just north of Weipa, Queensland on 19 March before losing strength. Though already considered a tropical cyclone for two days by the Bureau, the Joint Typhoon Warning Center (JTWC) issued their first advisory on the system just prior to its landfall; however, they considered it to be a tropical depression rather than a storm. After roughly 12 hours over land, a weakened Kathy emerged over the warm waters of the Gulf of Carpentaria on 20 March. Once over water, the JTWC classified the system as a tropical storm. Turning southwestward, the storm entered a region favoring significant development and soon began a period of rapid intensification.

Intensification took place through 22 March as convection deepened around Kathy's centre and a well-defined eye formed. Operational analysis of the storm indicated a minimum pressure of 920 hPa (mbar; 27.17 inHg); however, a reassessment in 2009 concluded that Kathy's pressure had been slightly lower, bottoming out at 916 hPa (mbar; 27.05 inHg). At this time, the storm was estimated to have a Dvorak technique rating of 7.0, equivalent to a Category 5 on the Saffir–Simpson hurricane scale;

As Cyclone Kathy neared the Australia coastline later on 22 March, it began to weaken as it interacted with land. Radar imagery depicted the system as having an eye  in diameter. Roughly 5 hours after peaking, the storm passed directly over the Sir Edward Pellew Group of Islands, resulting in a degrading structure. Near midnight, the system weakened to a Category 4 cyclone and made landfall in a remote region near Borroloola. Based on a wind gust to sustained ratio of 1.4, Kathy was estimated to have moved onshore with winds between 165 and 185 km/h (105 and 115 mph). Later that day, the system turned south-westward and persisted for another 24 hours before dissipating.

Impact
In Far North Queensland, Kathy brought moderate rainfall and strong winds to much of the region. Due to the relatively low intensity of the storm, damage was minimal and mainly confined to trees.

Striking the Sir Edward Pellew Group of Islands as a high-end Category 4 cyclone, Kathy wrought significant damage in the region. A storm surge of  struck Vanderlin Island, destroying much of the nesting ground for sea turtles. Several camps across the islands were destroyed. Offshore, 20 vessels were caught in the storm. One of these was the  prawn trawler Lindeman which capsized off the coast of Skull Island on 23 March. A fisherman on board drowned, with his body discovered three days later washed up on Centre Island. Three other trawlers ran aground on Vanderlin Island. Losses sustained by the ships were placed at A$5 million. The only population center significantly affected by the storm was Borroloola, where moderate to severe damage took place. Of the 90 homes in the town, only 10 were left undamaged. In all, losses from the storm were placed at A$12 ,million.

The remnants, however, triggered thunderstorms near Tennant Creek that produced  of rain in 24 hours. Along the mouth of the McArthur River, near where Kathy struck the mainland, the combination of severe winds and storm surge killed 80% (±20%) of the Rhizophoraceae mangrove trees in the region. Along the entire length of the river, 45% (±15.3%) of the Rhizophoraceae, Bruguiera and Ceriops as well as 18.5% (±11.4%) of the Exoecaria agallocha, Lumnitzera racemosa and Avicennia marina perished.

In the wake of the storm, Australian Prime Minister Bob Hawke promised residents of Borroloola that they would receive all possible help from the government. About 400 people in the town were left homeless by Cyclone Kathy. By 25 March, a Royal Australian Air Force aircraft was sent to the region carrying emergency supplies for sheltering displaced persons. Two patrol boats from the Royal Australian Navy were also sent to assist in relief efforts. One brought fuel and medical supplies and the other assisted trawlers set adrift or grounded by the storm.

See also

List of tropical cyclones
List of retired Australian region cyclone names

References

Notes

External links
 Joint Typhoon Warning Center (JTWC) .
 Australian Bureau of Meteorology .

1983–84 Australian region cyclone season
Category 5 Australian region cyclones
Retired Australian region cyclones
Tropical cyclones in Queensland
Tropical cyclones in 1984
Tropical cyclones in the Northern Territory